George Pendleton may refer to:

George C. Pendleton (1845–1913), U.S. Representative from Texas
George H. Pendleton (1825–1889), U.S. Representative and Senator from Ohio